Turanj  may refer to:

 Turanj, Karlovac, a suburb in Croatia
 Turanj, Zadar County, a village near Sveti Filip i Jakov, Croatia